Selivanovo is a rural locality (a village) in Yargomzhskoye Rural Settlement, Cherepovetsky District, Vologda Oblast, Russia. The population was 4 as of 2002.

Geography 
Selivanovo is located 28 km north of Cherepovets (the district's administrative centre) by road. Yenyukovo is the nearest rural locality.

References 

Rural localities in Cherepovetsky District